Chojnacki (feminine: Chojnacka; plural: Chojnaccy) is a surname of Polish language origin. It may refer to:
 Elisabeth Chojnacka (1939–2017), Polish harpsichordist
 Fidelis Chojnacki (1906–1942), Polish friar
 Jack Chojnacki (born c. 1941), American businessman
 Jadwiga Chojnacka (1905–1992), Polish actress
 Małgorzata Chojnacka (canoeist) (born 1983), Polish sprint canoeist
 Marek Chojnacki (born 1959), Polish footballer
 Maria Chojnacka (1931–2020), Polish athlete
 Matt Chojnacki (born 1973), American freestyle skier
 Matthew Chojnacki (born 1975), American writer
 Roman Chojnacki (1875–1938), Polish conductor

See also
 
 

Polish-language surnames